Knoxville is a city in Marion County, Iowa, United States. The population was 7,595 at the time of the 2020 census, an increase from 7,313 in the 2010 census. It is the county seat of Marion County. Knoxville is home of the National Sprint Car Hall of Fame & Museum, located next to the famous Knoxville Raceway dirt track.

History
The site for the future county seat of Marion County was selected because it was within a mile of the geographic center of the county, reasonably level and near a good source of timber.

Knoxville is located in south-central Iowa, some 35 miles southeast of Des Moines. The area was originally inhabited by Native Americans of the Sac and Fox tribes. At that time, prairie grass covered the countryside at heights of 8 to 10 feet. In 1835, Dragoons first explored the Des Moines River valley through this area. In 1842, the Sac and Fox Indians signed a treaty to sell lands in central Iowa to the new settlers known as the New Purchase of 1842. By 1843, settlers began moving here. The first Marion County Courthouse was erected three years later.

Knoxville was founded in 1845 when Joseph Robinson and James Montgomery, Commissioners from Scott and Wapello County, selected the site for Knoxville and designated it as the county seat. They named Knoxville in honor of General Henry Knox, hero of the Revolutionary War. The city's main streets are named after Robinson and Montgomery.

County surveyor Isaac B. Powers platted part of the town in September 1845, shortly after it was located. Clairborne Hall laid out the remainder of the town in the winter of 1846–47. Additional surveys were made in December 1849 and September 1852.

The first sale of lots on October 21, 1845, saw the best sites in town go for $15 to $65. The first survey made the streets 80 feet wide, alleys 10 feet wide, and lots 120’ x 60’, but the third survey changed the width of the streets to 50 feet, and made the blocks 265’ x 240’.

The first Marion County courthouse was built on a lot owned by L.C. Corny. Contractor Lewis M. Pearch started work on May 29, 1846, at a cost of approximately $80,000.

Knoxville remained an unincorporated village until 1853, when a movement for incorporation began. A judicial order was issued after an election in which 64 votes were cast in favor of incorporation, with 4 votes against. Knoxville was duly incorporated as a City in 1855.

In early 1853, the citizens of Marion County created a committee to attract railroad development to the county and to Knoxville, promising to buy shares in any railroad that reached town. The first contender was the Muscatine, Oskaloosa & Council Bluffs, proposing an east–west line that would pass through Knoxville, the line being suggested in January 1868 by the proposed Muscatine, Oskaloosa & Council Bluffs. By 1875, when this line reached Knoxville, it was the Chicago, Burlington & Quincy Railroad. The second railroad to reach Knoxville was the Chicago, Rock Island & Pacific, which completed a line from Oskaloosa in 1876.

For several years, the Number 5 mine in Flagler was one of the most productive in Iowa, employing around 150 men and working a coal vein over 8 feet (2.5 m) thick. The Oak Hill coal company also had mines in Flagler.

Shortly after the railroad reached Knoxville, J. T. James opened a coal mine in town just 8 blocks north of the courthouse. This mine continued in operation until 1890. A second mine nearby was operated by W. A. Gamble. In the 1880s, the White Breast Fuel Company opened the Number 11 mine at Flagler. This mine operated in a coal vein that was locally up to 14 feet thick, but only locally. The mine continued operating until 1892, working in progressively thinner coal as it expanded.

Demographics

2010 census
As of the census of 2010, there were 7,313 people, 3,169 households, and 1,925 families living in the city. The racial makeup of the city was 96.9% White, 1.1% African American, 0.3% Native American, 0.5% Asian, 0.2% from other races, and 1.0% from two or more races. Hispanic or Latino of any race were 1.9% of the population.

There were 3,169 households, of which 30.5% had children under the age of 18 living with them, 43.9% were married couples living together, 12.3% had a female householder with no husband present, 4.5% had a male householder with no wife present, and 39.3% were non-families. 34.9% of all households were made up of individuals, and 15.7% had someone living alone who was 65 years of age or older. The average household size was 2.25 and the average family size was 2.90.

The median age in the city was 41 years. 24.7% of residents were under the age of 18; 7.2% were between the ages of 18 and 24; 22.5% were from 25 to 44; 26.4% were from 45 to 64; and 19.1% were 65 years of age or older. The gender makeup of the city was 48.3% male and 51.7% female.

2000 census
According to the census of 2000, there were 7,731 people, 3,191 households, and 1,984 families living in the city. The racial makeup of the city was 97.00% White, 0.88% African American, 0.31% Native American, 0.52% Asian, 0.06% Pacific Islander, 0.28% from other races, and 0.94% from two or more races. 0.83% of the population were Hispanics or Latinos of any race.

There were 3,191 households, out of which 30.0% had children under the age of 18 living with them, 48.7% were married couples living together, 10.2% had a female householder with no husband present, and 37.8% were non-families. 33.4% of all households were made up of individuals, and 15.1% had someone living alone who was 65 years of age or older. The average household size was 2.28 and the average family size was 2.92.

Age spread: 23.9% under the age of 18, 7.8% from 18 to 24, 26.5% from 25 to 44, 22.2% from 45 to 64, and 19.6% who were 65 years of age or older. The median age was 40 years. For every 100 females, there were 98.6 males. For every 100 females age 18 and over, there were 95.6 males.

The median income for a household in the city was $34,055, and the median income for a family was $44,078. Males had a median income of $34,832 versus $21,593 for females. The per capita income for the city was $17,893. About 9.6% of families and 11.1% of the population were below the poverty line, including 16.1% of those under age 18 and 8.9% of those age 65 or over.

Geography
Knoxville is located in the South central portion of the State.

Climate

According to the Köppen Climate Classification system, Knoxville has a hot-summer humid continental climate, abbreviated "Dfa" on climate maps.

Education
The Knoxville Community School District operates local public schools.

Notable people

 Robert L. Burns, member of the Los Angeles City Council (1929–1945)
George Kruck Cherrie, naturalist and explorer, born in Knoxville
 James Fee, photographer
 Dixie Cornell Gebhardt, designer of the Flag of Iowa
 Joseph P. Graw, Minnesota state representative and businessman
 Edward R. Hays, U.S. congressman (1890–1891)
 James Mathews, U.S. congressman; professor at Iowa State College.
 Howard B. Myers, economist
 Frank Steunenberg, governor of Idaho (1897–1901); assassinated in 1905
 Edward C. Stone, director of NASA Jet Propulsion Laboratory (1991–2001); professor of physics at the California Institute of Technology
 William M. Stone, governor of Iowa (1864–1868)
 William Corwin Stuart, attorney and jurist
Jon Thorup, member of the Iowa House of Representatives
 Henry Carroll Timmonds, Missouri state representative and judge in late 1800s

References

External links

 

 
Cities in Iowa
Cities in Marion County, Iowa
County seats in Iowa